"'Aloha'" is the second single to Fat Joe's album Jealous Ones Still Envy 2 (J.O.S.E. 2).  It features Pleasure P and Rico Love.

Music video
The music video for "Aloha" was filmed in the middle of August 2009 and released on September 11, 2009. It was directed by Dayo.

Track listing
 Aloha (radio version)
 Aloha (explicit version)
 Aloha (instrumental)

Charts

References

Fat Joe songs
2009 singles
Pleasure P songs
2009 songs
Imperial Records singles
Songs written by Rico Love
Song recordings produced by Rico Love
Songs written by Fat Joe
Songs written by Earl Hood
Songs written by Eric Goudy